Five Plays is the eighth book by Anglo-Irish fantasy writer Lord Dunsany, considered a major influence on the work of J. R. R. Tolkien, H. P. Lovecraft, Ursula K. Le Guin and others. It was first published in hardcover by Grant Richards in February, 1914, and has been reprinted a number of times since.

The book is actually Dunsany's sixth major work, two of his preceding books having been chapbooks or selections from his other works.

In contrast to most of Dunsany's other early books, Five Plays is a collection of dramatic works, the first of several such collections.  All of the included plays were performed many times.

Contents
"The Gods of the Mountain"
"The Golden Doom"
"King Argimēnēs and the Unknown Warrior"
"The Glittering Gate"
"The Lost Silk Hat"

References

Five Plays (zipped text at mindspring.com)

1914 books
1914 plays
Plays by Edward Plunkett, 18th Baron of Dunsany